Al Shaikh Ayub Asmin is a Sri Lankan Tamil politician and provincial councillor.

Asmin is a member of the People's Movement for Good Governance.

Asmin contested the 2013 provincial council election as one of the Tamil National Alliance's candidates in Mannar District but failed to get elected. He was nevertheless appointed to the Northern Provincial Council through the two bonus seats of TNA. After the election he was appointed to assist the Chief Minister on the resettlement and rehabilitation of the province's Muslim population. He took his oath as provincial councillor in front of Chief Minister C. V. Vigneswaran at Veerasingam Hall on 11 October 2013.

References

Living people
Members of the Northern Provincial Council
People from Northern Province, Sri Lanka
Tamil National Alliance politicians
Year of birth missing (living people)